The Weedin Place Fallout Shelter is a disused fallout shelter in Seattle, Washington, United States. It was built in 1962–1963, under Interstate 5, to hold about 100 individuals. It had diesel generators, an air circulation system that included electric heating and air conditioning units; a well, pump and pressure tank; and piping connecting the facility to the city water and sewer systems. It was intended to be the prototype "for countless similar shelters that would be installed nationwide under interstate highways".

The fallout shelter is categorized by Washington State Department of Transportation (WSDOT) as a bridge, since it supports the southbound lanes of Interstate 5, and is eligible for inclusion in the National Register of Historic Places.

Prototype fallout shelter

As a prototype "community fallout shelter", the structure is considered "perhaps the only one of its kind in the world" and "apparently the first, and only, fallout shelter ever constructed in the U.S. under a public roadway".

It also had an artesian well. It was engineered by Andersen-Bjornstad-Kane firm in Seattle, and constructed by McDonald Construction of Seattle. It was originally designed house 200 people and hold enough supplies for 2 weeks to survive the initial blast. When it was dedicated, pamphlets circulated that said its capacity had grown to 300 people. 

It was built as a "dual purpose" building, meaning it would have other primary functions besides being a fallout shelter. It was initially used by the Washington State Patrol as a licensing office, then used by the WSDOT as file storage, and finally as storage for surplus furniture. Since 2018, it has been sealed shut after being broken into and stripped for parts.

References

Sources

Further reading

External links
Bridgehunter 

1963 establishments in Washington (state)
Bridges in Seattle
Buildings and structures completed in 1963
Cold War sites in the United States
Government buildings in Seattle
History of Seattle
Road bridges in Washington (state)